Liolaemus pyriphlogos is a species of lizard in the family Iguanidae.  It is endemic to Argentina.

References

pyriphlogos
Lizards of South America
Reptiles of Argentina
Endemic fauna of Argentina
Reptiles described in 2012
Taxa named by Andrés Sebastián Quinteros